Mesenochroa guatemalteca is a moth of the subfamily Arctiinae. It was described by Felder in 1874. It is found in Guatemala.

References

Arctiinae
Moths described in 1874